Poort (Dutch: port) is a Dutch surname that may refer to the following people:
Henk Poort (born 1956), Dutch actor and singer
Jarrod Poort (born 1994), Australian competition swimmer
Joris Poort (born 1983), American businessman and entrepreneur
Sjef Poort (1956–1998), Dutch voice actor

Dutch-language surnames